Nazia and Zoheb were a Pakistani pop duo from Karachi, Sindh formed in 1980. The group consisted of two siblings, Nazia Hassan and Zoheb Hassan (collectively known as Hassans or The Hassans or Hazan), who were a singing sensation and pop icons across South Asia. They are regarded as pioneers of the Pakistani pop scenes, and were one of the most successful Asian pop duos of all time, selling more than 105 million albums worldwide.

The duo initially gained prominence with their music single "Aap Jaisa Koi" first featured as a soundtrack for the 1980 Indian film Qurbani. The song was on the group's debut album Disco Deewane released in 1981 produced by Indian producer Biddu which became the best selling Asian pop album at the time charting in 14 countries worldwide becoming a hit in countries such as Brazil, Russia, South Africa, and Indonesia. The iconic album helped shape pop music in Pakistan and India as seen today. The duo released their second album Boom Boom in 1982 which was the soundtrack for the Bollywood movie Star. After two years the band recorded their critically acclaimed album Young Tarang in 1983. It was the first album of Pakistan pre MTV to feature music videos. Nazia and Zoheb released their fourth hit album, Hotline in 1987, which featured the duo's younger sister, Zahra Hassan. The group released their last studio album Camera Camera in 1992, which was written and produced solely by Zoheb.

Before the release of their fifth studio album, Nazia and Zoheb announced that it would be their last album. It did not achieve the same level of success of its predecessors as Nazia fell drastically ill and they could not promote the CD. After the album's release, Nazia left her singing career to focus on her health and personal life. Zoheb went on to pursue his career as an actor/ solo artist and released his debut album Kismat (2006).

The group was ended in the early 1990s, due to the illness of Nazia Hassan. She died later on 13 August 2000 due to lung cancer at the age of 35 in London. After her death, Zoheb Hassan also left singing before making a spectacular comeback in 2014 with hit songs "Jaana", "Chehra" and "Dheeray Dheeray" for the musical series Coke Studio Pakistan.

History

Early years (1975–1981)
Nazia and Zoheb spent their childhood in Karachi as well as London. In the late 1970s, both siblings attended and sang at "Sang Sang Chalien" and "Kaliyon Ke Mala", famous musical shows for children hosted by the music maestro Sohail Rana. In 1976 Nazia and Zoheb both made a cameo appearance in the Pakistani film Beyond the Last Mountain in a song as extras. Nazia's professional career started at the age of fifteen when she provided lead vocals for the song "Aap Jaisa Koi" from the 1980 film Qurbani. Nazia was introduced to the film's director Feroz Khan by his friend Biddu, an Indian music producer based in the United Kingdom. The song was a huge success in India and despite Nazia being a Pakistani, she gained overnight fame there too. In 1981, Nazia won the Filmfare Award for Best Female Playback Singer for "Aap Jaisa Koi".

Breakthrough era (1981–1983)
After the success of "Aap Jaisa Koi", Qurbani became a big hit and Nazia collaborated again with Biddu and her equally talented brother, Zoheb. In 1981, Nazia/Zoheb became the first teen singers to release a pop album. The album was entitled, "Disco Deewane". The album broke record sales in Pakistan, India, Bangladesh, South Africa and even topped the charts in the West Indies, Latin America and Russia. This album became a mega-hit and Nazia/Zoheb became gained legendary status. Zoheb composed 6 out of the 10 tracks on the album to establish himself as a successful singer/songwriter.

After the release of "Disco Deewane", Nazia and Zoheb were offered the chance to act in a movie by Biddu, but they refused to act and chose singing. Nazia's second album Star/Boom Boom was released in 1982. The soundtrack of the album was used in the movie Star.  The film did not do well at the box office but the album was super successful and increased the iconic status of Nazia and Zoheb in the region.

Continued success (1983–1989)
Nazia's third album, Young Tarang, was released in 1983. It was the first album in Pakistan to feature music videos, which were made in London by David and Kathy Rose. The album sold over 40 million copies. The album made Nazia/Zoheb's into one of the most known pop icons in South East Asia. Ankhien Milane Wale, "Zara Chehra" and "Dum Dum Dee Dee" became the most popular songs on the album. 

Over thirty years later, an India Today article titled "Nazia makes a lovely comeback" celebrated Nazia Hassan's music appearing in the cult 2012 film, Miss Lovely that had premiered at the Cannes Film Festival: "The film has made the audience nostalgic over Ahluwalia's use of the song "Dum dum de de" from Hassan's 1984 album, Young Tarang." Miss Lovely director, Ashim Ahluwalia, described keeping the original track untouched: "The song symbolises the '80s and the lyrics of the song were in sync with the mood of the film. [We] retained the original voice of Nazia. We didn't want to remix this song because the original was perfect."

After the release of Young Tarang, Nazia/Zoheb returned to singing for Bollywood movies as playback singers. She sang with legendary Kishore Kumar and Zoheb sang "Mein Aaya Tere Liye" for film superstar Govinda.

Nazia's fourth album, Hotline was released in 1987. Aa Haan, "Hum aur Tum", "Paisa Paisa" and "Telephone Pyar" were the most popular songs on the album. The songs were later performed in the revolutionary TV show, Music 89 which lead to Nazia and Zoheb being banned by the extremist elements in the Pakistani Parliament for promoting youth music and culture which was deemed un Islamic at that time. Ironically the show launched the careers of gave rise to numerous rising bands and singers in Pakistan.

Retirement (1990–1995)
By the end of the 1980s Nazia/Zoheb had become the most popular Asian pop singing duos. The show launched the careers of many new rising bands and singers and became popular in Pakistan. Nazia hosted another show, Dhanak on PTV in the same year, 1989.

In 1991, Nazia and Zoheb recorded her fifth album, Camera Camera. Before the album's release, Nazia and Zoheb announced it would be their last album. The album was released in 1992. This album featured hits like the Punjabi no, "Taali Dey Thalay". It was not as successful as their previous albums as Nazia was diagnosed with Cancer and both decided not to promote the album.

Nazia's death and beyond (2000–2002)

Nazia Hassan died of lung cancer in London on 13 August 2000 at the age of 35. She was admitted to North Finchley Hospice three days earlier when her condition deteriorated. She showed signs of mild recovery the day before she died and it was thought that doctors would allow her to go home. But early Sunday morning her mother, Muneeza, was called to the hospital where her daughter had started coughing heavily at around 9:15am. She died within minutes. Nazia is buried at the Muslim Hendon Cemetery in London.

On Saturday, 9 March 2002 Zoheb Hassan organised a Tribute Concert for his late sister Nazia Hassan at the Gymkhana Cricket Ground in front of 10,000 people. Zoheb sang a compilation of his hits to a hysterical crowd. The classic line-up of Vital Signs performed together on stage – for the first time in almost 7 years. The concert which featured over 30 artists and bands was reported by The News International as one of the best concerts ever seen in Pakistan.

On 23 March 2002 the Government of Pakistan conferred upon Nazia Hassan the highest civilian award Pride of Performance. The award was presented to Muniza Basir, mother of Nazia Hassan, by the President of Pakistan Pervez Musharraf in an official ceremony held at Islamabad. Zoheb went on to become the Honorary Advisor to the Governor of Sindh and went on to organise mega festivals such as "Sindh Festival", "Media & Entertainment Expo", "Pakistan UK Connect Expo" (UK), "Pakistan Arts & Crafts Fair", etc. He also initiated his media company B&H International Pvt Limited ( www.bh.com.pk)

In 2003, Nazia's family established the Nazia Hassan Foundation charitable organization. The organization was established in continuation of her lifelong charitable and social efforts to make the world a better place to live in for all irrespective of color, creed or religion.

2006 
Zoheb Hassan acted in the drama serial "Kismat" in 2006 and released his solo album of the same title in 2006 but soon after decided to leave music to focus on his family's extensive property and media business.

Discography

Albums

Film soundtracks

Songs

TV appearances

Remixes
Get a Little Closer, by Hazan, remixed by Sal Solo.

TV commercials

TV dramas 
 Kismet (Geo TV, 2006)

See also 
 List of Pakistani music bands
 Biddu
 Nermin Niazi and Feisal Mosleh (known for 1984's Disco Se Aagay)

References 

Musical groups from Karachi
Pakistani musical duos
Musical groups established in 1980
Nazia Hassan
Male–female musical duos